NanoRoute is an Integrated Circuit routing tool built into Cadence Encounter. Similar software includes Synopsys IC Compiler's ZRoute, and Magma Design Automation's Talus Router.

References
Cadence confirms acquisition of Plato from EE Times

External links
Cadence - NanoRoute

Digital electronics